The 1967 Humboldt State Lumberjacks football team represented Humboldt State College during the 1967 NCAA College Division football season. Humboldt State competed in the Far Western Conference (FWC).

The 1967 Lumberjacks were led by second-year head coach Bud Van Deren. They played home games at the Redwood Bowl in Arcata, California. Humboldt State finished with a record of six wins, three losses and one tie (6–3–1, 3–2–1 FWC). The Lumberjacks outscored their opponents 242–227 for the season.

Schedule

Team players in the NFL
The following Humboldt State players were selected in the 1968 NFL Draft.

Notes

References

Humboldt State
Humboldt State Lumberjacks football seasons
Humboldt State Lumberjacks football